Fay-ye Hajj Aghbary (also Romanized as Fāy-ye Ḩājj Āghbāry; also known as Fā-ye Bālā, Fā-ye ‘Olyā, and Nāy-e ‘Olyā) is a village in Julaki Rural District, Jayezan District, Omidiyeh County, Khuzestan Province, Iran. At the 2006 census, its population was 45, in 7 families.

References 

Populated places in Omidiyeh County